Muhammad Ridho Ficardo is an Indonesian politician and former governor of the province of Lampung. 

Ficardo made his efforts to promote tourism in the province, by hosting Indonesia's International Coffee Day celebrations in 2017, 

The same year he also helped to organize a Krakatoa festival commemorating the 1883 eruption of Krakatoa.

References

1980 births
Living people
People from Lampung
Governors of Lampung
Democratic Party (Indonesia) politicians